Jiří Matoušek (16 August 1927 – 14 March 2012) was a Czech basketball player. He competed in the men's tournament at the 1952 Summer Olympics.

References

1927 births
2012 deaths
Czech men's basketball players
Olympic basketball players of Czechoslovakia
Basketball players at the 1952 Summer Olympics
Place of birth missing